Korchyn is an inhabited locality in Ukraine and it may refer to:

 Korchyn, Chervonohrad Raion, a village in Chervonohrad Raion, Lviv Oblast
 Korchyn, Stryi Raion, Lviv Oblast, a village in Stryi Raion, Lviv Oblast
 Korchyn, Kostopil Raion, a village in Kostopil Raion, Rivne Oblast